Mitchell is a lunar impact crater, which is attached to the eastern rim of the larger and more prominent crater Aristoteles. It was named after American astronomer Maria Mitchell. The floor of Mitchell is rough and irregular, with a low central rise, being partially filled with the ejecta of the younger Aristoteles.  There is a slight notch in the southern rim, and the western wall has been completely absorbed by the rim of Aristoteles.

Satellite craters 

By convention these features are identified on lunar maps by placing the letter on the side of the crater midpoint which is closest to Mitchell.

See also 
 1455 Mitchella, asteroid
 Maria Mitchell Observatory

References

External links

 

Impact craters on the Moon